Tessit  is a small town and commune in the Cercle of Ansongo in the Gao Region of south-eastern Mali. As of 1998 the commune had a population of 6,717.

See also
Labbezenga

References

External links
 Tessit at csa-mali.org 

Communes of Gao Region